Korydallos is a station on Athens Metro Line 3.

Location
The station is located underneath Eleftherias square in Korydallos.

Station description
The station can be accessed by two ground-level entrances, both of which are glass-covered and lead to the concourse level. The concourse level is rectangular, daylight-penetrated by a single circular shaft on the ceiling, with vermilion and grey walls. The concourse level's ceiling is grey in the middle and vermilion on the sides, with small circular lamps that resemble stars. The platforms are on a northeast-southwest axis and each platform's decoration is divided in three sections. The north and south sides' walls are covered with polished granite blocks. In the middle section the platforms are slightly wider, the ceiling is supported by cylindrical pillars and the walls are covered with vermilion metal panels. The ceiling is grey and the part above the tracks is covered with curved vermilion metal panels.

Exits

Nearby points of interest
Eleftherias Sq.
Korydallos prison

Station layout

References

External links
 

Athens Metro stations
Railway stations opened in 2020
2020 establishments in Greece